Opera South is a name used by several opera companies. Two are in the United States, one in the United Kingdom.

Opera South (USA) for OperaSouth, Inc. in Atlanta, Georgia, and OPERA/SOUTH in Jackson, Mississippi
Opera South (UK) for the British company